Jordan Griffin (born February 23, 1990) is an American mixed martial artist who competes in the  Featherweight division. A professional competitor since 2011, he has competed for the Ultimate Fighting Championship, Legacy Fighting Alliance and King of the Cage. He is the former KOTC, RFO and Dakota FC Featherweight champion.

Martial arts career

Amateur career
Jordan Griffin made his amateur debut in 2009 as a welterweight, when he fought Luke Drummond during Racine Fight Night 5. Griffin won through a second round TKO. He won his second fight by a second round TKO, versus Trevor Konetzke, as well. He won his third fight against Mitchell Kanter by decision and fourth fight against Mark Mora by submission. He would then lose by knockout to Shane Hinton and decision to Tim Hallock. He won his last amateur fight against Micah Fulton  by a knockout. He ended his amateur career with a 5-2 record.

Early career
Jordan Griffin made his professional debut in 2011, as a lightweight, against Tyler Hellenbrand. He lost by decision. He lost his second fight against Gary Bivens by submission. He would win his third fight against Ryan Smith by unanimous decision, but lost the next one, versus Damian Norris, by TKO.

He would then go on a five fight winning streak, before dropping down to featherweight to face Robert Tahtinen. He won the fight by TKO. He won the next fight, against Anthony Fleming, by a guillotine choke. His seven fight winning streak was stopped by Dan Moret, whom defeated him by a rear naked choke.

In his next fight, he faced Cameron Ramberg for the Dakota FC Featherweight title. He won the fight by majority decision.

At KOTC - Total Dominance, Griffin fought Ben Pierre-Saint for the KOTC Featherweight title. He won by a head kick KO. Griffin went on to defend the title three times, finishing all three of those fights. For his fourth defense, he was scheduled to fight Juan Archuleta. Griffin lost by unanimous decision.

Dana White's Contender Series 
After winning his next three fights, Griffin was scheduled to fight Maurice Mitchell during Dana White's Contender Series 15. Griffin won the fight in the first round by a rear naked choke. He was awarded a UFC contract after the fight.

Ultimate Fighting Championship
Jordan Griffin was scheduled to make his UFC debut during UFC on ESPN: Ngannou vs. dos Santos against Chas Skelly. Skelly would get injured before the fight and was replaced by Vince Murdock. Murdock would later withdraw himself, as he was not medically cleared to fight.

Griffin made his debut during UFC on Fox: Lee vs. Iaquinta 2 against Dan Ige. Ige won a unanimous decision. Griffin suffered multiple torn muscles in his right arm during the fight.

His fight against Chas Skelly was rescheduled for UFC Fight Night: Cowboy vs. Gaethje. Skelly won the fight by unanimous decision.

Griffin achieved his first UFC win during UFC Fight Night: Benavidez vs. Figueiredo, when he faced T.J. Brown and won by a guillotine choke. This win earned him the Performance of the Night award.

Griffin was scheduled to fight a rematch with Darrick Minner on June 13, 2020 at UFC Fight Night: Eye vs. Calvillo. However, on the day prior to the event, Minner was pulled from the fight due to health issues surrounding his weight cut and the bout was cancelled.

Griffin faced Youssef Zalal on June 27, 2020 at UFC on ESPN: Poirier vs. Hooker. He lost the fight via unanimous decision.

Griffin faced Luis Saldaña on April 10, 2021 at UFC on ABC 2. He lost the bout via controversial unanimous decision. 16 out of 18 media scores gave it to Griffin.

After the loss he was released by UFC.

Post UFC 
Griffin made his first appearance the UFC release against Josh Rohler at NAFC: Colosseum on April 16, 2022. He lost the bout via unanimous decision.

Championships and accomplishments

Mixed martial arts
Ultimate Fighting Championship
Performance of the Night (One time) 
 King of the Cage
 King of the Cage Featherweight Champion (Two Defenses)

Mixed martial arts record 
 

|-
|Loss
|align=center|18–10
|Josh Rohler
|Decision (unanimous)
|NAFC: Colosseum
|
|align=center|3
|align=center|5:00
|Waukesha, Wisconsin, United States
|
|-
|Loss
|align=center|18–9
|Luis Saldaña
|Decision (unanimous)
|UFC on ABC: Vettori vs. Holland
|
|align=center|3
|align=center|5:00
|Las Vegas, Nevada, United States
|
|-
|Loss
|align=center|18–8
|Youssef Zalal
|Decision (unanimous)
|UFC on ESPN: Poirier vs. Hooker
|
|align=center|3
|align=center|5:00
|Las Vegas, Nevada, United States
|
|-
|Win
|align=center|18–7
|T.J. Brown
|Technical submission (guillotine choke)
|UFC Fight Night: Benavidez vs. Figueiredo
|
|align=center|2
|align=center|3:38
|Norfolk, Virginia, United States
|
|-
|Loss
|align=center|17–7
|Chas Skelly
|Decision (unanimous)
|UFC Fight Night: Cowboy vs. Gaethje
|
|align=center|3
|align=center|5:00
|Vancouver, British Columbia, Canada
|
|-
|Loss
|align=center|17–6
|Dan Ige
|Decision (unanimous)
|UFC on Fox: Lee vs. Iaquinta 2
|
|align=center|3
|align=center|5:00
|Milwaukee, Wisconsin, United States
|
|-
|Win
|align=center|17–5
|Maurice Mitchell
|Submission (rear-naked choke)
|Dana White's Contender Series 15
|
|align=center|1
|align=center|3:57
|Las Vegas, Nevada, United States
|
|-
|Win
|align=center|16–5
|Shawn West
|Submission (neck crank)
|LFA 41
|
|align=center|1
|align=center|4:52
|Prior Lake, Minnesota, United States
|
|-
|Win
|align=center|15–5
|Darrick Minner
|Submission (armbar)
|LFA 34
|
|align=center|2
|align=center|3:59
|Prior Lake, Minnesota, United States
|
|-
|Win
|align=center|14–5
|Cody Stevens
|Submission (guillotine choke) 
|Big Guns 25
|
|align=center|4
|align=center|3:13
|Mansfield, Ohio, United States
|
|-
|Loss
|align=center|13–5
|Juan Archuleta
|Decision (unanimous)
|KOTC: Destructive Intent 
|
|align=center|5
|align=center|5:00
|Washington, Pennsylvania, United States
|
|-
|Win
|align=center|13–4
|Adam Ward
|TKO (retirement)
|KOTC: Generation X
|
|align=center|1
|align=center|5:00
|Carlton, Minnesota, United States
|
|-
|Win
|align=center|12–4
|Justin Likness
|TKO (punches)
|KOTC: Battle at the Lake
|
|align=center|2
|align=center|2:36
|Saint Michael, North Dakota, United States
|
|-
|Win
|align=center|11–4
|Seth Dikun
|Submission (rear-naked choke)
|KOTC: Warriors Collide
|
|align=center|2
|align=center|3:02
|Manistee, Michigan, United States
|
|-
|Win
|align=center|10–4
|Ben Pierre-Saint
|TKO (head kick)
|KOTC: Total Dominance
|
|align=center|2
|align=center|2:37
|Carlton, Minnesota, United States
|
|-
|Win
|align=center|9–4
|Cameron Ramberg
|Decision (majority)
|Dakota FC: Spring Brawl 2015
|
|align=center|1
|align=center|4:17
|Fargo, North Dakota, United States
|
|-
|Loss
|align=center|8–4
|Dan Moret
|Submission (rear-naked choke)
|RFA 19
|
|align=center|1
|align=center|3:09
|Prior Lake, Minnesota, United States
|
|-
|Win
|align=center|8–3
|Anthony Fleming
|Submission (guillotine choke)
|NAFC: Summer Slam
|
|align=center|1
|align=center|0:59
|Milwaukee, Wisconsin, United States
|
|-
|Win
|align=center|7–3
|Robert Tahtinen
|TKO (punches)
|Complete Cage Promotions 
|
|align=center|2
|align=center|2:42
|Danbury, Wisconsin, United States
|
|-
|Win
|align=center|6–3
|Josh Wolfe
|Submission (guillotine choke)
|Great Lakes Combat Association: Battle at Bad River
|
|align=center|1
|align=center|N/A
|Wisconsin, United States
|
|-
|Win
|align=center|5–3
|Gino DiGiulio
|Decision (unanimous)
|NAFC: Battle in the Ballroom
|
|align=center|3
|align=center|5:00
|Milwaukee, Wisconsin, United States
|
|-
|Win
|align=center|4–3
|Alex Van Krevelen
|Decision (unanimous)
|Caged Chaos at Canterbury Park 2
|
|align=center|3
|align=center|5:00
|Shakopee, Minnesota, United States
|
|-
|Win
|align=center|3–3
|Dennis Anderson
|TKO (punches)
|Madtown Throwdown 29
|
|align=center|1
|align=center|3:30
|Madison, Wisconsin, United States
|
|-
|Wi
|align=center|2–3
|Evian Rodríguez 
|Submission (brabo choke)
|KOTC: Trump Card
|
|align=center|2
|align=center|1:54
|Lac Du Flambeau, Wisconsin, United States
|
|-
|Loss
|align=center|1–3
|Damian Norris
|TKO (doctor stoppage)
|XFO 43
|
|align=center|2
|align=center|3:02
|Hoffman Estates, Illinois, United States
|
|-
|Win
|align=center|1–2
|Ryan Smith
|Decision (unanimous)
|Madtown Throwdown 26
|
|align=center|3
|align=center|5:00
|Madison, Wisconsin, United States
|
|-
|Loss
|align=center|0–2
|Gary Bivens
|Submission (guillotine)
|Combat USA: Country USA 1
|
|align=center|1
|align=center|0:51
|Oshkosh, Wisconsin, United States
|
|-
|Loss
|align=center|0–1
|Tyler Hellenbrand
|Decision (unanimous)
|Combat USA: Wisconsin State Finals
|
|align=center|3
|align=center|5:00
|Green Bay, Wisconsin, United States
|
|-

Amateur mixed martial arts record

|-
|Win
|align=center| 5-2
|Micah Fulton 
|KO (Punch)
|Extreme Cagefighting Organization 7
|
|align=center|1
|align=center|1:14
|Wisconsin Dells, Wisconsin, United States
|
|-
|Loss
|align=center| 4-2
|Tim Hallock 
|Decision (Unanimous)
|Combat USA Fighting Championship 6/18/10
|
|align=center|3
|align=center|3:00
|Milwaukee, Wisconsin, United States
|
|-
|Loss
|align=center| 4-1
|Shane Hinton 
|KO (Punch)
|Extreme Cagefighting Organization 5
|
|align=center|1
|align=center|0:16
|Baraboo, Wisconsin, United States
|
|-
|Win
|align=center| 4-0
|Mark Mora 
|Submission (Rear Naked Choke) 
|Konquer the Kage 31: Immortality
|
|align=center|1
|align=center|1:02
|Eau Claire, Wisconsin, United States
|
|-
|Win
|align=center| 3-0
|Mitchell Kanter 
|Decision (Unanimous)
|Racine Fight Night 6 
|
|align=center|3
|align=center|3:00
|Racine, Wisconsin, United States
|
|-
|Win
|align=center| 2-0
|Trevor Konetzke 
|TKO (Punches)
|IFC: Caged Combat Oneida 
|
|align=center|2
|align=center|2:25
|Green Bay, Wisconsin, United States
|
|-
|Win
|align=center| 1-0
|Luke Drummond 
|TKO (Punches)
|Racine Fight Night (RFN) 5 - Thanksgiving Thrash 
|
|align=center|2
|align=center|1:23
|Racine, Wisconsin, United States
|
|-
|}

References

External links 

Living people
Ultimate Fighting Championship male fighters
American male mixed martial artists
Featherweight mixed martial artists
Mixed martial artists utilizing Brazilian jiu-jitsu
Sportspeople from Milwaukee
Mixed martial artists from Wisconsin
1990 births
American practitioners of Brazilian jiu-jitsu